Service Management Facility (SMF) is a feature of the Solaris operating system as of version 10 and OpenSolaris-descendant illumos with its illumos distributions, that creates a supported, unified model for services and service management on each Solaris or illumos system and replaces init.d scripts. SMF introduces:

 Dependency order.  Services sometimes depend on one another for proper operation, and a robust system should know each service's dependencies.  If an underlying service fails, it needs to be corrected before other services that depend upon it are affected.
 Configurable boot verbosity
 Delegation of tasks to non-root users.  A service can be configured to run within a limited set of privileges, rather than as the all-powerful root user.  If a service has been compromised, the amount of damage that can be inflicted by the intruder will be minimized if the service's power is constrained to that of a more limited user.
 Parallel starting of services.  This speeds up the boot process by starting multiple services simultaneously, allowing idle CPU time resulting from a service that is temporarily blocked to be relinquished for use by other services that can start independently of the blocked service.
 Automatic service restart after failure.  Works in conjunction with the Solaris Fault Manager, allowing software recovery in the event of hardware faults (CPU, memory), admin error such as accidental kills, and software core dumps.

All these capabilities are made possible by treating Services as "first class objects".  That is, they are more than just user-executed software to the OS.  They can be defined to have special states that allow finer control and permit monitoring and probing for diagnosing software failures, rather than having the administrator or dedicated "restarter" modules kill and restart the service as before.

What are services? 

Services are software objects that provide a set of capabilities to other software.  For example, a webserver provides HTTP service to web browsers.  Other services include NFS for sharing files on a network, DHCP for dynamic IP address assignment, and Secure Shell for remote logins.  Even higher level functions can be services, such as specific databases for e-commerce, finance, manufacturing control, etc.  Typically, services are automatically started at boot up, long-lived, have common states (e.g. running, not running), relationship & dependencies (Sendmail service depends on Naming service, which depends on Networking services), and are critical to the dedicated function of the server.

What it replaces 

In versions of Solaris prior to Solaris 10, and in UNIX in general, services are configured in text files, with startup files in the /etc/rc.d/ directory trees, and configuration data in files such as /etc/inittab and /etc/inetd.conf.  A typical system could have dozens of configuration files, and configuration could involve various methods, including editing shell scripts.  With SMF, there is one consistent interface to ease administration.

There has been no traditional definition or constraint of what a service is, making administration difficult.  With SMF, each service can have a set of defined states, allowing admins to control services in a consistent way based on their state.

SMF concepts 

Instances:  a service is a collection of configurations.  An instance is a running execution of a defined service executable.  One can have many instances of a defined service, such as multiple webservers listening on different ports referencing different WWW root directories.

See also
 Runlevel
 Process supervision
 Operating system service management
 systemd

References

External links 
 Solaris Service Management Facility - Quickstart Guide
 SMF Sun BluePrint
 Service Management Facility (SMF) overview
 OpenSolaris Service Management Facility community
 Using Solaris SMF by Chris Josephes at O'Reilly Network
 Oracle Documentation - Introduction to SMF Services
 My Little SMF FAQ

Process (computing)
Sun Microsystems software
Unix process- and task-management-related software